Puretty was a South Korean girl group formed by DSP Media. The group debuted in Japan in 2012 through the anime series Pretty Rhythm: Dear My Future, where fictionalized versions of the members appeared as the secondary cast, and their songs, "Check it Love" and "Shuwa Shuwa Baby", were used as the series' ending theme songs. Despite plans for them to make their Korean debut, the group disbanded in January 2014, with DSP Media announcing the possibility of its members becoming part of other groups in the future.

History
In January 2012, DSP Media announced that they would be debuting a sister group to Kara and Rainbow. Temporarily nicknamed the DSP Girls, the group revealed plans to debut simultaneously in both Korea and Japan through the 2012 video game and anime Pretty Rhythm: Dear My Future, with fictionalized versions of the members as the secondary cast. Puretty would sometimes feature alongside Prizmmy at the end of each episode of Pretty Rhythm: Dear My Future in a segment called "Pretty Rhythm Studios." In the Korean dub of the series, the members of Puretty had their own live-action segment titled "Charming School at Prism Stone."

Puretty held their first official performance at the Tokyo Toy Show 2012 on 15 June, promoting their debut Japanese single "Check it Love". In August 2012, they performed at A-Nation. In January 2013, the group released their second single, "Shuwa Shuwa Baby."

Disbandment 
On 17 January 2014, DSP Media announced that the group had been disbanded with the possibility of its members debuting into other groups in the future.

Members
Yoo Hye-in (유혜인)
Cho Shi-yoon (조시윤)
Yoon Chae-kyung (윤채경)
Jeon So-min (전소민)
Jeon Jae-un (전재은)

Discography

Japanese discography

Singles

Filmography

Television

References

External links
  

Musical groups established in 2012
K-pop music groups
South Korean pop music groups
South Korean dance music groups
South Korean girl groups
Japanese-language singers
2012 establishments in South Korea
Universal Music Japan artists
Musical groups disestablished in 2014
DSP Media artists
Pretty Rhythm